The 1960–61 Turkish National League was the third season of professional football in Turkey. The league consisted of 20 clubs, with Fenerbahçe winning their second title.

Overview
Fenerbahçe won their second Milli Lig title after edging out rivals Galatasaray by one point. The previous years champion, Beşiktaş, finished in third. Fenerbahçe were the lone Turkish representatives at the 1961–62 European Cup, as Turkey did not send a team to the Inter-Cities Fairs Cup, and there was no cup competition held to send winners to the European Cup Winners' Cup. Metin Oktay finished top scorer for the third time in a row, scoring 36 goals, his highest tally to date.

The season marked the first time a club from outside of Ankara, Istanbul or İzmir competed; Adana Demirspor earned promotion to the league the previous season. Their stay did not last long, as they were relegated back to the Adana Regional League after finishing bottom of the table and finishing 4th in the Baraj Games. Adana Demirspor were the only club to be relegated and Yeşildirek were the only club to be promoted.

Final league table

Results

Baraj Games

References

Turkish National League
1960–61 in Turkish football
Turkey